Prewitt Ulrich Roberts (April 27, 1888 – December 13, 1964) was an American college football player and coach. Roberts served as the head football coach at William Jewell College in Liberty, Missouri in 1912, compiling a record of 5–3.

Head coaching record

College

References

External links
 

1888 births
1964 deaths
Missouri Tigers football players
William Jewell Cardinals football coaches
High school football coaches in Missouri
High school football coaches in Tennessee
People from Dallas County, Missouri